Carpathonesticus puteorum  is a species of araneomorph spider of the family Nesticidae.

Description
Carpathonesticus puteorum specimens have a pale reddish prosoma with black suffusion. The opisthosoma is pale grey with dorsal pairs of patches. The legs are a reddish yellow.

Original publication

References 

Nesticidae
Spiders described in 1894
Spiders of Europe